The FIS Ski Cross World Cup is an annual freestyle skiing competition, a subdiscipline of FIS Freestyle Skiing World Cup under International Ski Federation. Races are hosted primarily at ski resorts in North America and the Alps in Europe.

Discipline title

Men

Ladies

Wins
Statistics as of 2019-20 season.

Men

Ladies

Nations which have won World Cup races
The table below lists those nations which have won at least one World Cup race (as of 31 December 2017).

Scoring system

References

External links
Freestyle Skiing at FIS-Ski.com
fisfreestyle.com

Ski cross
Skiing world competitions
Ski cross
Recurring sporting events established in 2002